A number of ships have been named Adolf Vinnen, including -

, a four-masted barque built in 1892 as Somali. In service under this name 1912–14 then interned in Mexico. Sold and renamed in 1921.
, a five-masted barquentine built by Krupps in 1921-22, that was wrecked on her maiden voyage
, a German weather ship sunk by the British destroyer  in 1940
, a West German cargo ship built in 1962

Ship names